Imbe may refer to:
 Imbe (tree), a fruit tree native to Africa
 Imbe, Okayama, a township in Japan
 Imbe Station
 Imbé, a municipality in Rio Grande do Sul, Brazil
 Imbé de Minas, a municipality in Minas Gerais, Brazil
 Imbé River, a river in Rio de Janeiro, Brazil
 Improved multi-band excitation, or IMBE, a speech coding standard